The Anare Mountains are a large group of mainly snow-covered peaks and ridges along the northern coast of Victoria Land, Antarctica. The group is bounded on the north and east by the Pacific Ocean, on the west by Lillie Glacier, and on the south by Robertson Glacier, Ebbe Glacier and Dennistoun Glacier. Kirkby Glacier,  in length, drains the central Anare Mountains and flows northwest to the sea  from Cape North, and just north of Arthurson Bluff, northern Victoria Land. The mountain range is situated on the Pennell Coast, a portion of Antarctica lying between Cape Williams and Cape Adare.

Mountains in this area were first sighted by Captain James Clark Ross in 1841. They were photographed during United States Navy Operation Highjump (1946–1947) and were surveyed by United States Geological Survey helicopter teams, 1962–63. Named by the northern party of the New Zealand Geological Survey Antarctic Expedition, 1963–64, for the Australian National Antarctic Research Expeditions (ANARE), 1962, under Phillip Law, which performed survey work along the coast.

See also
Buell Peninsula
Prince Charles Mountains
Tiger Peak

References

Mountain ranges of Victoria Land
Pennell Coast